Udeoides viridis is a moth in the family Crambidae. It was described by Koen V. N. Maes in 2006. It is found in Kenya.

References

Endemic moths of Kenya
Moths described in 2006
Spilomelinae